The Grey Nuns' Hospital (also known as Hôpital général des frères Charron) was a hospital in Montreal, Quebec, Canada that operated from 1695 to 1880. It is located south of Place d'Youville and west of Rue Saint-Pierre.

History 

The name Hôpital général des frères Charron refers to a French religious community of the same name. It focused on care of the poor. The hospital was built outside the Fortifications of Montreal in 1695. Management and hospital administration were entrusted to the Grey Nuns in 1747.

The hospital suffered a major fire in 1765 and was rebuilt again according to the style of French architecture, that is to say, with large walls composed of rough stone called rubble that had been squared and covered in plaster. The architecture, which is very utilitarian, is rudimentary and has little ornamentation. The gable roof prevents the accumulation of snow in winter. The structure, being less massive and simpler to build meant a lower risk of fire. Finally, esses are used to reinforce the structure with stems screwed into the wood frame.

In 1880, the nuns decided to rent the building in order to maintain administrative offices in their communities.

In 1971, the Grey Nuns decided to return to their first mother-house. Major renovations of the building were undertaken.

The site was designated a National Historic Site of Canada in 1973.

See also 

 Marguerite d'Youville

References

External links 
 Fiche Vieux-Montréal : Ancien Hôpital général 

Defunct hospitals in Canada
Hospitals in Montreal
1695 establishments in the French colonial empire
National Historic Sites in Quebec
French colonial architecture in Canada
Burned buildings and structures in Canada
Old Montreal
Infrastructure completed in 1765
Catholic hospitals in North America
Heritage buildings of Quebec